Matabeleland cricket team was a first-class cricket team representing the Matabeleland province in Zimbabwe. They competed in the Logan Cup from 1994 until the format was revamped in 2007.

The side played its home games at both the Queens Sports Club and Bulawayo Athletic Club in Bulawayo.

Honours
 Logan Cup (2) — 1995–96, 1998–99

References 
 Ultimate Encyclopaedia of Cricket
 Wisden Cricketers Almanack (annual)

External links
 History of Logan Cup 
 Domestic records

History of Zimbabwean cricket
Former Zimbabwean first-class cricket teams
Cricket teams in Zimbabwe
Former senior cricket clubs in Zimbabwe
Cricket in Matabeleland